Nathan Cassidy is a British comedian and podcaster.  In 2021, he was nominated for an Off West End Stage Award for his show 'Bumblebee' along with nominations for Best Comedy Show at the Greater Manchester Fringe and Buxton Fringe. 'Bumblebee' was released as an Amazon Prime Special in 2022. In 2022 he was nominated for Best Standup at the Buxton Fringe for his show 'Hot Tub God' and this show along with his show 'Observational' were awarded with the Best Standup Award at the Brighton Fringe 2022. He was previously nominated for Best Show at the Leicester Comedy Festival 2020 for his show 'Observational'. This show was widely reported in the press as the only live show at the Edinburgh Festival Fringe 2020. The show was given four stars by The Times which reviewed it as 'The best show at the Fringe. A classic, structured, rollercoaster Fringe hour...star-in-waiting...he is untouchable.' Previously he was nominated for a Malcolm Hardee Award in 2012, won best solo comedy show on the Buxton Fringe in 2014, and was nominated for the same award in 2015, 2016, 2017 2019, and 2021.  He has also won the Sir Michael Caine Award for new writing in theatre. He also presents the podcast Psycomedy about the Psychology of stand-up comedy and the daily comedy/piano podcast Daily Notes.

After a brief spell on the UK comedy circuit in 2000–01 Cassidy became a regular on the UK Comedy circuit in 2009, has performed solo shows at the Edinburgh Festival Fringe every year since 2010 and has become known for his innovation including a nomination for the Malcolm Hardee Award for his 2012 show 'Free Pound', in which he gave each audience member £1 to see the show. In 2012 he also produced feature documentary 'I am Orig' which charted a year giving money away; this was shown at the Edinburgh Banshee Labyrinth in August 2012.

In 2013, his fourth solo show was 'Edinburgh Comedy Award Winner', in which he gave each audience member a £1 bet on him winning the Edinburgh Comedy Award. In 2013, Cassidy talked about 'Free Pound' and 'Edinburgh Comedy Award Winner' in a feature Tuesday night interview with Phil Williams on BBC Radio 5 Live, in which he said that how his grandfather saved all his life and then was unable to spend the money he had saved had inspired shows where he was now giving money away. Cassidy became the 10/1 Ladbrokes favourite for the Edinburgh Comedy Award in 2013 – after starting at 50/1, Ladbrokes dropped the odds first to 20/1 at the Brighton Fringe (as featured by The Argus) then to 10/1 during the Fringe in August 2013.

His 2014 show 'Date of Death' won Best solo comedy show on the Buxton Fringe and his 'Back to the Future' shows were nominated for the same award in 2015. His 2016 show '42' was also nominated for Best solo comedy show on the Buxton Fringe alongside comedians including Jerry Sadowitz as was his 2017 show 'The Man in the Arena'.  At the Edinburgh Fringe 2017 he won the World's Best MC Award and a 2017 Terrier Award. In July 2019 his show 'Observational' was nominated for Best Individual Comedy at the Buxton Fringe. In February 2020 'Observational' was nominated for Best Show at the Leicester Comedy Festival.

In 2020 his show 'Roses From Joe' at the Buxton Fringe was named in several online publications as the 'first solo UK comedy show after lockdown due to the COVID-19 pandemic'. In an interview with the British Comedy Guide Cassidy said that the show is about 'putting love out into the world, not to anyone in particular', like the public applauding the NHS during lockdown. In 2021 his show 'Bumblebee' was featured in several publications as being offered up to be performed at people's houses as part of the 'Edinburgh Fringe Fringe' at the Edinburgh Festival Fringe. 'Bumblebee' was nominated for best solo comedy show at the 2021 Buxton Fringe and at the Greater Manchester Fringe, and was also nominated for an Off West End Stage Award 2021.

Cassidy's 2015 trilogy of Back to the Future shows were discussed in a Guardian article on how popular films have been used to 'inspire Fringe shows'.  In this article Cassidy said how these shows reflected the Back to the Future films which evoke 'not only flying cars and hoverboards but ideas about different stages of life, expectations and disappointments'. He performed these shows in February 2015 at the Leicester Comedy Festival, at the Brighton Fringe in May 2015 and in August 2015 at The Gilded Balloon in Edinburgh.

Nathan Cassidy is a regular host of The Rat Pack stand-up comedy which was a multiple critics choice of Time Out. It played at the Leicester Square Theatre from 2014 to 2015 and currently has a weekly Friday night residence at the Camden Comedy Club in London.

Nathan Cassidy also presents the ongoing weekly podcast Psycomedy about the Psychology of stand-up comedy. Guests have included Marcus Brigstocke, Shazia Mirza, Nick Helm and Stephen Bailey. In February 2020 Psycomedy was the number one comedy podcast in Argentina His other podcast Daily Notes gathered over half a million downloads by April 2022 and has been number one Impro podcast in several countries. 

As an actor, he appeared in West End musical The Donkey Show and Channel 5 (UK) and Discovery Channel's "Serial Killers" playing the part of Stephen Sinclair, Dennis Nilsen's final victim.  Cassidy has also done TV warm-up work for the Clare Balding Show (BT Sport).

Awards
Sir Michael Caine Award for new writing in theatre Winner 2007
Malcolm Hardee Award Nominee 2012
Best solo comedy show Buxton Fringe Winner 2014
Best solo comedy show Buxton Fringe Nominee 2015
Best solo comedy show Buxton Fringe Nominee 2016
Best solo comedy show Buxton Fringe Nominee 2017
Terrier Award Edinburgh Fringe Winner 2017
Best solo comedy show Buxton Fringe Nominee 2019
Best show Leicester Comedy Festival Nominee 2020
Best solo comedy show Buxton Fringe Nominee 2021
Best comedy show Greater Manchester Fringe Nominee 2021
Off West End Stage Awards Nominee 2021
Best standup Buxton Fringe Nominee 2022
Best standup Brighton Fringe Winner 2022

References

External links 
 NathanCassidy.com

Living people
Year of birth missing (living people)
British male comedians
English male comedians